John William Glover (28 October 1876 – 20 April 1955) was an English professional footballer who played as a right back.

Born in West Bromwich, Staffordshire, Glover made 200 appearances in the First Division for Blackburn Rovers (who signed him from the Rudge-Whitworth team in Coventry), Liverpool and Small Heath (later Birmingham), and in the 1900–01 season won the league championship with Liverpool. He and two other Liverpool players were banned from football for six months in 1903 for "accepting illegal financial inducements" from Southern League club Portsmouth to sign for them. When the ban ended, he signed for Small Heath, where he developed as a strong-tackling defender and formed an excellent full-back pairing with Frank Stokes.

Glover played for the Football League representative team and played in England trials, but was not selected for the national team. After retiring from football he kept a public house in Dudley, Worcestershire, and also represented Shropshire at bowls. He died in Dudley at the age of 78.

Honours
Liverpool
 Football League First Division champions 1900–01.

Notes

References

1876 births
Sportspeople from West Bromwich
1955 deaths
English footballers
Association football fullbacks
West Bromwich Albion F.C. players
Blackburn Rovers F.C. players
Gillingham F.C. players
Liverpool F.C. players
Birmingham City F.C. players
Brierley Hill Alliance F.C. players
English Football League players
English Football League representative players